Lipovka is a rural locality (a selo) and the administrative center of Lipovskoye Rural Settlement, Bobrovsky District, Voronezh Oblast, Russia. The population was 803 as of 2010. There are 14 streets.

Geography 
Lipovka is located 49 km south of Bobrov (the district's administrative centre) by road. Shestakovo is the nearest rural locality.

References 

Rural localities in Bobrovsky District